Nadrožica is a small settlement southeast of Gorjansko in the Municipality  of Komen in the Littoral region of Slovenia next to the border with Italy.

References

External links
Nadrožica on Geopedia

Populated places in the Municipality of Komen